The 2013–14 Segona Divisió is the 15th season of second-tier football in Andorra.

Regular stage

League table

Results

Promotion play-offs

League table

Results

Topscorers

Relegation play-offs
The seventh-placed club in the Primera Divisió competed in a two-legged relegation playoff against the runners-up of the Promotion play-offs, for one spot in 2014–15 Primera Divisió.

External links
 

Segona Divisió seasons
Andorra
2013–14 in Andorran football